Privileged may refer to:

Film and television 
 Privileged (TV series), a 2008 US television series
 Privileged (film), a 1982 Hollywood film

Other uses 
 Immunologically privileged site, a body location where immune response to antigens is non-destructive or suppressed
 Privileged motion, a motion of parliamentary procedure
 Privileged group, an economics term
 Privileged pattern, a musical motive, figure, or chord which is repeated and transposed

See also
 Privilege (disambiguation)